Rogers Place is a multi-use indoor arena in Edmonton, Alberta, Canada. Construction started in March 2014, and the building officially opened on September 8, 2016. The arena has a seating capacity of 18,347 as a hockey venue and 20,734 as a concert venue.

It replaced Northlands Coliseum (opened 1974) as the home of the NHL's Edmonton Oilers and the WHL's Edmonton Oil Kings. The arena is located at the block between 101 and 104 Streets and 104 and 105 Avenues. Public transit access to the arena is provided by the Edmonton Light Rail Transit system (MacEwan station on the Metro Line) and Edmonton Transit Service bus.

Development

The arena building was initially estimated to cost $450 million. The City of Edmonton was to pay $125 million, the Katz Group of Companies was to contribute $100 million, and $125 million was to be paid from a user-paid facility fee. The remaining money was expected to come from the province or federal agencies. Estimated cost then increased substantially during continued discussions to a current estimated price of $480 million for the arena, and $604.5 million for the entire project.

On October 26, 2011, the Edmonton City Council approved a funding framework for the arena by a vote of 10–3. A year later, however, with costs escalating and the Katz Group making increasing demands, the city passed a motion to end negotiations with the Katz Group and to seek out a new deal or find other options but would still be open to communicating with Daryl Katz for future talks.

On May 15, 2013, the Edmonton City Council passed a deal that saw the City of Edmonton, and Oilers owner Daryl Katz each put in more money to offset the $55 million shortfall needed to build the new downtown arena. Katz chipped in an additional $15 million through the Edmonton Arena Corporation and another $15 million came from the Community Revitalization Levy (CRL).
On December 3, 2013, Rogers Communications announced a 10-year naming rights deal for the new arena, henceforth known as Rogers Place. Rogers Place is one of three Rogers-branded sporting facilities in Canada (and one of two in the NHL), alongside Rogers Centre in Toronto and Rogers Arena in Vancouver.

The arena was funded by the following sources:
$279 million from the Community Revitalization Levy (CRL) and other incremental revenues (increased parking revenue, reallocation of existing subsidy paid to Northlands and new taxes from business in the arena)
$125 million from ticket surcharge on all events in the new arena
$137.81 million from lease revenue for the Arena 
$23.68 million in cash from Edmonton Arena Corporation
$25 million from other government sources

A new agreement was reached on January 23, 2013 between the two parties on moving forward with the arena. On February 11, 2014, it was announced that the project was completely funded, and would go ahead. Construction of the new arena broke ground in March 2014.

The arena triggered a "hospitality explosion" downtown before ground was even broken, as businesses competed for properties around the arena site. In early 2014, there were far fewer options to lease or purchase as competition mounted, including Brad J. Lamb, who announced a $225 million pair of new condo towers.

By December, it was estimated that $2.5 billion in downtown development had been directly connected to Rogers Place. On July 13, 2015, it was announced that the arena district would be officially branded as Ice District, spanning from 103rd Avenue to 106th Avenue. Ice District has ranked as the fastest growing arena district in the history of similar projects.

Homeless population displacement 
The development of the arena prompted concerns about the displacement of the homeless population in the downtown area. Edmonton officials consulted cities that had similar construction projects that displaced homeless populations like Los Angeles and Columbus, Ohio in an attempt to ratify these concerns with the local population. City officials were criticized for inaccurate homelessness count in Edmonton resulting in a miscalculated attempt to prevent the displacement of the homeless population. Accounts of police harassment and the busy environment has led the homeless population from staying away from downtown despite the number of services available to them in the area.

History
Rogers Place officially opened on September 8, 2016.

The first live event to be held in the arena was September 16, 2016, as 12,032 fans welcomed Keith Urban with guests Dallas Smith and Maren Morris for the Ripcord World Tour.

The first hockey game played in the arena featured the Edmonton Oil Kings taking on the Red Deer Rebels in a WHL match-up on September 24, 2016. Trey Fix-Wolansky scored the first goal in the arena at the 0:22 mark of the second period as the Oil Kings went on to win the game in a shoot-out, marking the team's first win in the new building.

The Oilers played their first game on October 12, 2016, against their nearby rivals, the Calgary Flames. Prior to the game, there was a pregame ceremony featuring former Oilers Wayne Gretzky and Mark Messier, where a statue of Gretzky was unveiled outside of the arena. Patrick Maroon scored the first NHL goal in the arena, as the Oilers went on to defeat the Flames 7–4; earning their first win in the building. The Oilers' first season in the arena saw them qualify for the playoffs for the first time since 2006, ending an 11-year playoff drought. The first playoff game was played on April 12, 2017, where the Oilers lost in overtime to the San Jose Sharks 3–2. Two days later, the Oilers picked up their first playoff game win at the arena by defeating the Sharks 2–0.

The arena was chosen to be one of two hubs for the 2020 Stanley Cup playoffs during the COVID-19 pandemic, hosting the Western Conference Playoffs, the 2020 NHL Eastern Conference Finals, the 2020 NHL Western Conference Finals and the 2020 Stanley Cup Finals.

Events

References

External links

City of Edmonton: Rogers Place

Indoor arenas in Alberta
Indoor ice hockey venues in Canada
Leadership in Energy and Environmental Design basic silver certified buildings
Leadership in Energy and Environmental Design certified buildings in Canada
Music venues in Edmonton
Rogers Communications
Oilers Entertainment Group
Sports venues in Edmonton
Ice District
2016 establishments in Alberta
Sports venues completed in 2016
National Hockey League venues
Edmonton Oilers